Sinjai Regency is a regency of South Sulawesi Province of Indonesia. The regency, whichis separated from the Bone Regency to its north by the River Tangka, covers an area of 819.96 km2. It had a population of 228,936 at the 2010 Census and 259,478 at the 2020 Census; the official estimate as at mid 2021 was 261,366. It includes the Nine Islands (Kepulauan Sembilan) in the Gulf of Bone off the east coast of the southern peninsula of Sulawesi; this archipelago forms a district within the regency. The regency's principal town lies at Sinjai, a port situated on the east coast of that peninsula.

Sembilan Islands (Pulau Sembilan)
The small group of mountainous, forest-covered islands known as the Sembilan Islands lies of the east coast of South Sulawesi province, and are northeast of the port town of Sinjai. Notwithstanding the name, there are actually ten named islands forming the group, as Pulau Kanalosatu and Pulau Kanalodua are structurally linked and normally classed as one island (Kanalo). There are four administrative desa within the district. 

In the south, the desa of Pulau Buhung Pitue (with an area of 2.15 km2) covers the island of Pulau Burungloe. To the northeast, the desa of Pulau Harapan (1.75 km2) covers the islands of Pulau Liangliang and Pulau Kambuno. Further north is the desa of Pulau Padaelo (1.80 km2), which covers the island of Pulau Kodingare. Finally, north and west of Pulau Kodingare, the desa of Pulau Persetuan (1.85 km2) covers the islands of Pulau Batanglampe, Pulau Kanalosatu, Pulau Kanalodua, Pulau Katindoang, Pulau Lapoipoi and Pulau Larearea.

Administrative Districts 
The regency is divided into nine districts (kecamatan), tabulated below with their areas and their populations at the 2010 Census and the 2020 Census, together with the official estimates as at mid 2021. The table also includes the locations of the district administrative centres, the number of administrative villages in each district (totalling 67 rural desa and 13 urban kelurahan), and its post code(s).

References

Regencies of South Sulawesi